Livio Bendaña Espinoza (born September 22, 1935 in Diriamba, Nicaragua) is a former Nicaraguan footballer and coach.

Club career
Born in Diriamba, Bendaña joined local side Diriangén in 1950 and played his first game in 1952, aged 16. His father sent him to join a US military school instead of him moving to Costa Rican team Saprissa and on his return in 1956 he went to Mexico to play for Universidad Puebla. He joined Nicaraguan side UNAN de León in 1958 and had further spells at Diriangén and in Honduras with F.C. Motagua.

International career
Nicknamed Pichichi, he played for the national team from 1952 through 1967.

Personal life
His son, Livio José Bendaña, also became a striker with the national team in the 1980s and 1990s.

References

1935 births
Living people
People from Carazo Department
Association football forwards
Nicaraguan men's footballers
Nicaragua international footballers
Diriangén FC players
F.C. Motagua players
Nicaraguan expatriate footballers
Expatriate footballers in Mexico
Expatriate footballers in Honduras
Nicaraguan expatriate sportspeople in Honduras
Nicaraguan expatriate sportspeople in Mexico
Liga Nacional de Fútbol Profesional de Honduras players
Nicaraguan football managers
Diriangén F.C. managers